Saints is Destroy the Runner's debut album released through Solid State Records on September 12, 2006. It is also the only album to feature Kyle Setter as lead vocalist and Jeremiah Crespo as bassist.

Indie Vision Music gave a positive review to the album, remarking positively on the variation from hard core metal "Aggressive, pop-influenced metal", though noting that metalcore traditionalists would "dismiss the album as too weak".

Track listing

Personnel
Destroy the Runner
Kyle Setter – lead vocals
Nick “Maldy" Maldonado – lead guitar
Duane Reed – rhythm guitar, vocals
Jeremiah Crespo – bass guitar
Marc Kohlbry – drums

Guest personnel
Cove Reber - backing vocals
Chad Ackerman – backing vocals

References

2006 debut albums
Tooth & Nail Records albums
Solid State Records albums
Destroy the Runner albums